Sonia Iovan-Inovan (born 29 September 1935) is a retired Romanian artistic gymnast who competed at the 1956, 1960 and 1964 Olympic Games. She is a double Olympic bronze medalist, a bronze world medalist and a multiple European medalist.

References

Living people
Sportspeople from Cluj-Napoca
Romanian female artistic gymnasts
Gymnasts at the 1956 Summer Olympics
Gymnasts at the 1960 Summer Olympics
Gymnasts at the 1964 Summer Olympics
Olympic gymnasts of Romania
Olympic bronze medalists for Romania
Medalists at the World Artistic Gymnastics Championships
1935 births
Olympic medalists in gymnastics
Medalists at the 1960 Summer Olympics
Medalists at the 1956 Summer Olympics
20th-century Romanian women